Lin Cheng-fong (born 1 December 1949) is a Taiwanese politician.

Lin was raised in Guishan, Taoyuan, where he attended elementary school.

He was elected to the Guishan Township Council, then served on the Taoyuan County Council for two terms, from 1990 to 1998. He won the township's mayoral election later that year, and was reelected in 2002. Lin contested the 2004 legislative election as a Kuomintang candidate, and was seated to the Legislative Yuan as a representative of Taoyuan County. While a member of the Legislative Yuan, Lin drew attention to a budget proposed in 2005 for flood prevention. In 2007, the Liberty Times reported that Lin was considering leaving the Kuomintang, which he denied. After Taoyuan became a special municipality in 2014, he was elected to the first convocation of the Taoyuan City Council. During his first term, Lin raised questions about New Taipei residents dumping trash in Taoyuan. He was reelected to the Taoyuan City Council in 2018.

References

1949 births
Living people
20th-century Taiwanese politicians
Members of the 6th Legislative Yuan
Kuomintang Members of the Legislative Yuan in Taiwan
Taoyuan City Members of the Legislative Yuan
Taoyuan City Councilors
Mayors of places in Taiwan